WISE J163940.83−684738.6 (designation is abbreviated to WISE 1639−6847, or W1639) is a brown dwarf of spectral class Y0-Y0.5, located in constellation Triangulum Australe (it's the nearest star / brown dwarf in this constellation) at approximately 16 light-years from Earth.

Discovery
WISE 1639−6847 was discovered in 2012 by C. G. Tinney et al. from data, collected by Wide-field Infrared Survey Explorer (WISE) Earth-orbiting satellite — NASA infrared-wavelength 40 cm (16 in) space telescope, which mission lasted from December 2009 to February 2011.

In 2012 Tinney et al. carried out follow-up observations of WISE 1639−6847 using the FourStar infrared mosaic camera mounted on the 6.5 m Magellan Baade telescope at Las Campanas Observatory, Chile (on 2012 May 10–11 (UT)); and spectroscopy using the Folded-port Infrared Echellette (FIRE) also mounted on the 6.5 m Magellan Baade telescope (on 2012 July 10 (UT)).

In 2012 Tinney et al. published a paper in The Astrophysical Journal, where they presented discovery of a newfound by WISE Y-type brown dwarf WISE 1639−6847 (the only brown dwarf discovery, presented in the article): the paper was accepted for publication on 20 September 2012, submitted to arXiv on 27 September 2012, and published in November 2012.

Physical properties
WISE 1639−6847 has absolute magnitude in J-band 22.14 ± 0.22.

See also
List of nearest stars and brown dwarfs

References

Brown dwarfs
Y-type stars
Triangulum Australe
WISE objects
20121231